Ballad of the Valiant Knight Ivanhoe is a 1983 Soviet adventure film, based on the 1819 novel Ivanhoe by Walter Scott. It reached the 9th place in Soviet box office distribution of 1983 with 28.4 million viewers.

Plot

Production
The filming took place in Khotyn Fortress and Kamianets-Podilskyi Castle. The movie features songs originally written and performed by Vladimir Vysotsky for the 1975 Soviet film The Arrows of Robin Hood, but removed from the latter for political reasons.

Cast

 Tamara Akulova as Lady Rowena
 Peteris Gaudins as Ivanhoe
 Boris Khimichev as Brian De Bois-Guilbert
 Leonid Kulagin as Cedric the Saxon
 Romualds Ancans as Richard the Lionheart
 Boris Khmelnitsky as Robin Hood
 Yuri Smirnov as Friar Tuck
 Aleksandr Filippenko as Wamba
 Vitautas Tomkus as Reginald Front-de-Boeuf
 Algimantas Masiulis as Prince John
 Nikolai Dupak as Prior Aymer
 Maya Bulgakova as Ulrica
 Oleg Fedulov as Knight
 Vladimir Talashko as Messenger
 Grigory Lyampe as Isaac

External links

1983 films
1983 drama films
Films based on Ivanhoe
1980s Russian-language films
1980s historical adventure films
Mosfilm films
The Ballad of the Valiant Knight
Soviet historical adventure films
Films shot in Ukraine